Benjamin Constant may be:
People
 Benjamin Constant (1767–1830),  Swiss-French politician & author Henri Benjamin Constant de Rebecque
 Benjamin Constant (military) (1836–1891), Brazilian military & politician Benjamin Constant Botelho de Magalhães
 Jean-Joseph Benjamin-Constant (surname sometimes seen as "Benjamin Constant") (1845–1902), French painter
Places
 Benjamin Constant, Amazonas, a city in the state of Amazonas, Brazil
Benjamin Constant do Sul, a town in the state of Rio Grande do Sul, Brazil
Other
 Instituto Benjamin Constant